Aún soltera is the first book of the Uruguayan Dani Umpi. It was published in 2003. The novel describes how a casual relationship can change a person with an armed scheme of life.

Published by Eloísa Cartonera, this book was reprinted by Mansalva Edition in 2006.

References 

2003 novels
Uruguayan novels
Spanish-language books
2003 debut novels